The 2020 LET Access Series was a series of professional women's golf tournaments held from August through October 2020 across Europe. The LET Access Series is the second-tier women's professional golf tour in Europe and is the official developmental tour of the Ladies European Tour.

Tournament results
The 2020 schedule was severely impacted by the COVID-19 pandemic with many tournaments either being postponed or cancelled. The table below shows the revised 2020 schedule released mid-year. The numbers in brackets after the winners' names show the number of career wins they had on the LET Access Series up to and including that event.

Order of Merit rankings
The top player on the LETAS Order of Merit earned full LET membership for the 2021 Ladies European Tour.

See also
2020 Ladies European Tour
2020 in golf

References

External links

LET Access Series seasons
LET Access Series
LET Access Series